Minqing railway station is a railway station in Minqing County, Fuzhou, Fujian, China. It is an intermediate stop on the Nanping–Fuzhou railway. The station is currently used for freight handling only, but it previously handled passenger services.

History
The railway station opened in 1959. Passenger transportation ended on 15 May 2016. Passengers were advised to use Minqing North railway station instead.

References

Railway stations in Fujian
Railway stations in China opened in 1959